The Diana, Princess of Wales Memorial Walk is a  long circular walking trail in central London, England, dedicated to the memory of Diana, Princess of Wales.

Overview
The walk passes between Kensington Gardens, Hyde Park, Green Park and St. James's Park in a figure-eight pattern, passing five sites that are associated with Princess Diana's life: Kensington Palace, Spencer House, Buckingham Palace, St. James's Palace, and Clarence House. It is marked with ninety individual plaques, each of which has a heraldic rose etched in the centre made of aluminium. Chancellor of the Exchequer Gordon Brown, who was the Chairman of the Diana, Princess of Wales, Memorial Committee was quoted as saying it is "one of the most magnificent urban parkland walks in the world." The Diana, Princess of Wales Memorial Walk is in London, and celebrates the life of the Princess of Wales who died in a car accident on 31 August 1997 in Paris.

The walk was constructed at a cost of £1.3 million. No member of the Royal Family was present at its opening.

See also
Diana, Princess of Wales Memorial Fountain
Diana, Princess of Wales Memorial Playground

References

Further reading

External links

Diana, Princess of Wales Memorial Walk information from The Royal Parks, includes downloadable PDF map

https://www.royalparks.org.uk/parks/hyde-park/things-to-see-and-do/sports-and-leisure/the-diana-princess-of-wales-memorial-walk 

2000 establishments in England
Monuments and memorials in London
Geography of the City of Westminster
Tourist attractions in the City of Westminster
Memorials to Diana, Princess of Wales
Footpaths in London
Buildings and structures completed in 2000